Al Pratt may refer to:

Al Pratt (baseball) (1848-1937), American baseball pitcher and manager
Atom (Al Pratt), a DC Comics superhero